Frank Asch (born August 6, 1946 in Somerville, New Jersey) is an American children's book writer, best known for his Moonbear picture books.

In 1968, Asch published his first picture book, George's Store. The following year, he graduated from Cooper Union with a BFA. Since then he has taught at a public school in India, as well as at a Montessori school in the United States, and conducted numerous creative workshops for children. He has written over 60 books, including Turtle Tale, Mooncake, I Can Blink and Happy Birthday Moon. In 1989 he wrote Here Comes the Cat! in collaboration with Vladimir Vagin. The book was awarded the Russian National Book Award and was considered the first Russian-American collaboration on a children's book.

Asch lived in Somerville, New Jersey and Middletown Springs, Vermont.

He lives in Kapa'au Hawaii with his wife, Jan.

References

External links

 

1946 births
Living people
American children's writers
Writers from Somerville, New Jersey
People from Rutland County, Vermont